Gianfranco Gallone (born April 20, 1963) is an Italian prelate of the Catholic Church and a diplomat of the Holy See.

Biography
Gianfranco Gallone was born in Ceglie Messapica on 20 April 1963. He was ordained a priest for the Diocese of Oria on 3 September 1988.

After his ordination, he earned a degree in canon law and the licentiate in liturgy. On 19 June 2000, he joined the diplomatic service of the Holy See. He served in the  Nunciatures in Mozambique, Israel, Slovakia, India and Sweden, and in the Relations Section of the Secretariat of State in Rome.

On 2 February 2019, Pope Francis appointed him Titular Archbishop of Motula and Apostolic Nuncio to Zambia. Cardinal Secretary of State Pietro Parolin consecrated him a bishop on 19 March 2019.

On 8 May 2019, he was appointed Apostolic Nuncio to Malawi as well.

On 3 January 2023, he was appointed as nuncio to Uruguay.

See also
 List of heads of the diplomatic missions of the Holy See

References

External links

 Catholic Hierarchy: Archbishop Gianfranco Gallone 

1963 births
Living people
People from the Province of Brindisi
Apostolic Nuncios to Zambia
Apostolic Nuncios to Malawi
Apostolic Nuncios to Uruguay